Nagase is a Japanese surname. Notable people with the surname include:

Jinen Nagase (born 1943), Japanese politician
Masatoshi Nagase (born 1966), Japanese actor
Tomoya Nagase (born 1978), Japanese actor and pop musician
Miyu Nagase (born 1988), Japanese pop musician
Takanori Nagase (born 1993), Japanese judoka
Takuya Nagase, Japanese shogi player
, Japanese actor
Ren Nagase (永瀬 廉|, born 1999), Japanese pop musician King & Prince

Fictional characters
Nagase, character in The King of Fighters series universe.
Reiko Nagase, character in the Ridge Racer series
Kaede Nagase, character in the Negima! Magister Negi Magi series
Kei Nagase, character in the Ace Combat series
Yusuki Nagase, character in the To Heart series
Daisuke Nagase, character in the Persona 4 and Persona 4 Golden video games
Nagisa Nagase, character in Shonan Junai Gumi and Great Teacher Onizuka

See also
Nagase Station, a railway station in Higashiosaka
JR Nagase Station, a railway station in Higashiosaka
Bushū-Nagase Station (武州長瀬駅, Bushū-nagase-eki), is a railway station operated by Tōbu Railway located in Moroyama, Saitama
Kita-Nagase Station (北長瀬駅, Kitanagase-eki), a train station in Okayama, Okayama Prefecture

Japanese-language surnames